Kampong Orang Kaya Besar Imas (commonly abbreviated as OKBI) is a village in Brunei-Muara District, Brunei, and a neighbourhood in the capital Bandar Seri Begawan. The population was 1,228 in 2016. It is one of the villages within Mukim Berakas 'A'. The postcode is BB4113.

History 
The village was established in 1954 as one of the areas designated by the government for some of the Kampong Ayer residents to resettle on land under the National Resettlement Programme in the 1950s.

Geography 
The village is located in the central part of Brunei-Muara District. It is one of the neighbourhoods in Bandar Seri Begawan, the capital of Brunei. It is contiguous with the neighbourhoods of Pengiran Siraja Muda to the north, Sungai Akar to the east, Pulaie to the south, Anggerek Desa to the west and Pancha Delima to the north-west.

Administration 
The village has been part of Bandar Seri Begawan's municipal area since the expansion of the municipality's spatial jurisdiction in 2007.

References 

Neighbourhoods in Bandar Seri Begawan
Villages in Brunei-Muara District
Public housing estates in Brunei